All Star Extravaganza VI is a professional wrestling pay-per-view event produced by Ring of Honor (ROH). It took place on September 6, 2014, at the Mattamy Athletic Center in Toronto, Ontario, Canada.

Storylines
All Star Extravaganza VI featured eight professional wrestling matches, which involved different wrestlers from pre-existing scripted feuds, plots, and storylines that played out on ROH's television programs. Wrestlers portrayed villains or heroes as they followed a series of events that built tension and culminated in a wrestling match or series of matches.

Results

References

External links
Ring of Honor's official website

Ring of Honor pay-per-view events
Events in Toronto
2014 in Toronto
Professional wrestling in Toronto
September 2014 events in Canada
2014 Ring of Honor pay-per-view events